Eupithecia saisanaria is a moth in the family Geometridae. It is found in Mongolia.

References

Moths described in 1882
saisanaria
Moths of Asia